Sliema Aquatic Sports Club is a waterpolo club from Sliema, Malta, playing in the Maltese Waterpolo Premier League. The club was founded in 1912 and is the most successful in Malta, with 31 championships and 25 Knock-out Cups.

The Club's original name was Sliema United; the name of Sliema Aquatic Sports Club was assumed in 1930.

The club also has a Swimming section.

In 2014, Dr. Frank Testa, a lawyer, was elected president.

First team
As at June 30, 2018:

Current squad
 Joseph Sammut
 Jerome Gabarretta
 David Fenech
 Christian Presciutti
 Mark Meli
 Kai Dowling
 M. Spiteri Staines
 Michael Cordina
 Jamie Gambin
 Zach Mizzi
 Nicholas Bugelli
 Zach Sciberras

Coaching staff
Head Coach:  Sergio Afrić
Asst. Coach:  Giuseppe Dato
Technical Director:  John Soler
Team Physio:  Luke Busuttil Leaver

Committee
As at June 30, 2018:
President: Frank Testa
Vice-President: Kevin Saliba
Secretary General: Darren Saliba
Asst. Sec. Gen.: Patrick Cachia
Treasurer: Andrew Galea
Asst. Treasurer: Kevin-James Fenech
Premises Manager: Mark Muscat
Events & Advertising: Daniela Said
Development: Yani Ellul
Public Relations: Francesco Cutajar
Finance and Development: Jean Borg

References

External links
 Official Website

Water polo clubs in Malta
Sliema
Sports clubs established in 1912
1912 establishments in Malta